"No Way Back" / "Cold Day in the Sun" is the fourth single released from Foo Fighters' fifth album, In Your Honor. It is a double A-side single, including "No Way Back" and "Cold Day in the Sun", which is from the second disc of the album.

Song information
"Cold Day in the Sun" is the first original song that features drummer Taylor Hawkins on lead vocals, while lead singer Dave Grohl plays drums. Hawkins wrote the music for the song in 2001. During pre-production of In Your Honor, Hawkins played the song on an acoustic guitar and suggested that Grohl record it. While an electric version was considered, it was eventually recorded for the acoustic album. Hawkins wrote the lyrics the morning before the song was recorded and considered them sub-par: "To be honest, the lyrics suck, It's more about the melody. And Dave always said he liked it, and I was like, 'Yeah, bull.'"

Billboard cited "Cold Day in the Sun" as one of the standout tracks on CD2 of In Your Honor.

Music video
The video for "No Way Back" shows clips of the band on tour, mainly in Europe, including Dave Grohl spitting beer on the crowd and playing ice hockey.

Use in other media
"No Way Back" is featured in the video games Madden NFL 06 and Guitar Hero: Warriors of Rock. In addition, the song along with fellow In Your Honor tracks "Resolve" and "Miracle" appeared on the TV show The West Wing.

Other versions
"Cold Day in the Sun" was featured on the Skin and Bones DVD (US version, recorded late August 2006 at the Pantages Theater in Los Angeles) and the Foo Fighters Live at Wembley Stadium DVD (filmed on June 7, 2008) as well as the special concert for Live on Letterman (filmed April 12, 2011). Taylor Hawkins is featured singing and drumming, while Dave Grohl is featured on acoustic guitar and backup vocals. "No Way Back" was also featured on the Foo Fighters Live at Wembley Stadium DVD.

Track listing
All tracks written by Dave Grohl, Taylor Hawkins, Chris Shiflett, & Nate Mendel except where noted.

A. "No Way Back" – 3:17
A. "Cold Day in the Sun" (Hawkins) – 3:23
B. "Best of You" (Live at the Supertop, Auckland, New Zealand; 26 November 2005) – 6:23

Chart positions

Weekly charts

Year-end charts

References

2006 singles
2005 songs
Foo Fighters songs
Songs written by Dave Grohl
Song recordings produced by Nick Raskulinecz